Cémaco District is a district (distrito) of Comarca Emberá-Wounaan in Panama. The capital is Unión Chocó.  The area of this district is 3097.5 sq. kilometers. It is on the eastern part of Comarca Emberá-Wounaan. The other side of the Comarca is Sambú District.

Administrative divisions
Cémaco District is divided administratively into the following corregimientos:

 Cirilo Guaynora
 Lajas Blancas
 Manuel Ortega

See also
 Panama
 Districts of Panama
 Embera-Wounaan, indigenous peoples of Colombia and Panama
 Emberá languages, indigenous language family in Colombia and Panama

Notes

References

Districts of Panama
Comarca Emberá-Wounaan